"Control" is a song by American hip hop recording artist Big Sean, featuring fellow American rappers Kendrick Lamar and Jay Electronica. The song was originally intended to be included on Big Sean's second studio album Hall of Fame (2013) or Jay Electronica's debut album, but was ultimately removed from the final track-listing due to sample clearance issues. "Control" impacted American mainstream urban radio on August 14, 2013, as a promotional single for Hall of Fame. The track contains samples such as "Where I'm From" (1997) by Jay-Z, "El Pueblo Unido Jamás Será Vencido" (1974) by Quilapayún and Sergio Ortega and an interpolation of "Get Bizy" (2011) by Terrace Martin, which also features fellow rappers Kendrick Lamar and Jay Electronica.

Release
Def Jam Recordings serviced "Control" to American mainstream urban radio on August 14, 2013, while a release to urban contemporary radio followed on August 27. It peaked at number 11 on the United States Billboard Bubbling Under Hot 100 Singles chart and at number 43 on the Billboard Hot R&B/Hip-Hop Songs chart.

Controversy
Much media attention was brought to the lyrical content of Lamar's verse on "Control", in which he calls out, by name, 11 fellow rappers—J. Cole; Meek Mill; Drake;  Big K.R.I.T.; Wale; Pusha T; ASAP Rocky; Tyler, The Creator and Mac Miller, as well as his co-artists on the song, Big Sean and Jay Electronica—and raps: "I got love for you all but I'm trying to murder you niggas  / Trying to make sure your core fans never heard of you niggas  / They don't want to hear not one more noun or verb from you niggas. " In the same verse, he proclaims himself to be "the king of New York" and "king of the Coast".

Lamar's Twitter account saw a 510% increase in followers in the week following the track's release, while his Wikipedia page garnered 200,000 page views.

Response
The song garnered many responses and diss tracks from several notable rappers in the form of song, many of which are labeled "Kendrick Lamar Response" or "Control Response." Kendrick Lamar responded to the amount of responses saying the best were by King Los, Joell Ortiz, Joe Budden and Chocolate Drop, Kevin Hart's rap persona, also calling Papoose's the "comical joint". Rappers who responded via song include:

Reception and impact 
"Control" received rave reviews from critics and fans alike upon its release, with many critics and fans praising Kendrick Lamar's verse in particular. Complex ranked the song number ten on their list of the 50 Best Songs of 2013. Rob Kenner said, "No matter which verse you prefer it’s hard to deny that "Control" will go down in history as a milestone in hip-hop, and easily ranks as one of 2013's most important records." Rolling Stone also positioned the song at number 13 on their list of the 100 best songs of 2013. They said, "Lamar hops on this chipmunk-soul track and spits the rap verse of the year" XXL named it one of the top five hip hop songs of 2013. NME ranked the song at number 41 on their list of the 50 best songs of the year. It was positioned at number 73 on Pitchfork Media's list of the 100 best songs of 2013. Complex also named Lamar's appearance the best rap verse of 2013.

About the song, Big Sean said: "There’s a lot of negativity on that song, and I don’t fuck with negative shit. People love drama, people love bullshit. I knew when Kendrick did that name-dropping that it was just gonna set it off, and I could see why people gravitated towards that verse for that reason. I respected him for thinking of that. I never wanna shade anybody. I would’ve been a ho-ass nigga if I cut that out of his verse, or if I didn’t put the song out."

In 2015, Rolling Stone wrote about the impact of the song during the 2010s and on Kendrick's generation; "Control" inspired responses from B.o.B ("How 2 Rap"), Joell Ortiz ("Outta Control"), Lupe Fiasco ("SLR 2"), Joey Bada$$ ("Killuminati Pt. II"), Meek Mill ("Ooh Kill 'Em") and many, many others. More than being the "Roxanne, Roxanne" of the new millennium, the subtext is that rappers responded to Lamar with actual songs and freestyles. Twitter rants, YouTube threats and random keyboard dissing no longer sufficed."

Charts

References

2013 songs
2013 singles
Big Sean songs
Kendrick Lamar songs
Songs written by Kendrick Lamar
Song recordings produced by No I.D.
Songs written by No I.D.
Songs written by Big Sean
Diss tracks